The 2018–19 Basketball League of Serbia is the 13th season of the Basketball League of Serbia, the highest professional basketball league in Serbia. Also, it's the 75th national championship played by Serbian clubs inclusive of nation's previous incarnations as Yugoslavia and Serbia & Montenegro.

Teams

Distribution
The following is the access list for this season.

Promotion and relegation 
Teams promoted from the Second League
Sloboda
Novi Pazar
Teams relegated to the Second League
Sloga
Kragujevački Radnički

Venues and locations

Personnel and sponsorship

Coaching changes

First League

League table

Positions by round

Results

Super League

Qualified teams

Group A

Standings and results

Positions by round

Group B

Standings and results

Positions by round

Playoffs

The playoffs are scheduled to start on June 2, 2019 and end on June 20, 2019.

Bracket

Semifinals

Finals

Clubs in European competitions

See also
2018–19 Second Men's League of Serbia (basketball)
2018–19 Radivoj Korać Cup
2018–19 ABA League First Division
2018–19 ABA League Second Division
2018–19 Women's Basketball League of Serbia
Teams 
 2018–19 KK Crvena zvezda season
 2018–19 KK Partizan season

References

External links
 Official website
 League at srbijasport.net

Basketball League of Serbia seasons
Serbia
Basketball